Blessing Kaku (born 5 March 1978 in Ughelli, Nigeria) is a former Nigerian international football player, who was a member of the national squad at the 2000 Summer Olympics in Sydney. He played for Enosis Neon Paralimni. He has also played for K.R.C. Genk in Belgium, Hapoel Be'er Sheva, Maccabi Tel Aviv, F.C. Ashdod, Maccabi Petah Tikva (all in Israel), Bolton Wanderers, and Derby County but failed to make an impact in England in his short spells with the latter two clubs.

His transfer from F.C. Ashdod to Bolton Wanderers in August 2004 is one of those about which the Stevens inquiry report in June 2007 expressed concerns because of the apparent conflict of interest between agent Craig Allardyce, his father Sam Allardyce - the then manager at Bolton - and the club itself.

External links

Notes and references

1978 births
Living people
Nigerian footballers
Nigeria international footballers
Olympic footballers of Nigeria
Footballers at the 2000 Summer Olympics
Sharks F.C. players
R.W.D. Molenbeek players
K.R.C. Genk players
Hapoel Be'er Sheva F.C. players
Bolton Wanderers F.C. players
Derby County F.C. players
F.C. Ashdod players
Maccabi Tel Aviv F.C. players
Maccabi Petah Tikva F.C. players
Expatriate footballers in Israel
Enosis Neon Paralimni FC players
Expatriate footballers in Cyprus
Expatriate footballers in England
Expatriate footballers in Belgium
Nigerian expatriate footballers
Premier League players
Belgian Pro League players
Israeli Premier League players
Cypriot First Division players
Association football midfielders
K.R.C. Zuid-West-Vlaanderen players